Viorel Manole (born May 31, 1956) is a Romanian former volleyball player who competed in the 1980 Summer Olympics.

He was born in Brasov.

In 1980 he was a squad member of the Romanian team which won the bronze medal in the Olympic tournament.

External links
IOC database
europafm.ro 

1956 births
Living people
People from Brașov
Romanian men's volleyball players
Olympic volleyball players of Romania
Volleyball players at the 1980 Summer Olympics
Olympic bronze medalists for Romania
Olympic medalists in volleyball
Medalists at the 1980 Summer Olympics